Sculpture on the Gulf is a temporary outdoor art exhibition on a coastal headland on Matiatia Bay, Waiheke Island, New Zealand. It is a biennial event founded in 2003 by the Waiheke Community Art Gallery.

History and format
At the first event in 2003, there were two awards made: a "People’s Choice" and a "Premier" award. At artists' request the Premier award was discontinued in 2005 and a fee to each artist paid instead. A Premier award was reinstated in 2013 and 2015, but at the request of artists abandoned in 2017.

By 2009 the exhibition took place over three, rather than two weeks, and included a programme for schools.

Sculpture on the Gulf resumed in March 2022 after a break due to COVID restrictions. 

"Waiheke Island’s biennial Sculpture on the Gulf exhibition charts [New Zealand's] own rising interest in outdoor sculpture trails. In 2003, the first year it was held, the event attracted 12,000. Numbers attending rose to 32,000 in 2011, and 40,000 in 2017."

Many notable New Zealand artists have exhibited, over the years, in the biennial event, their works displayed along a 2 kilometre track that runs around Te Whetumatarau Point.  Exhibiting artists have included Paul Dibble, Jeff Thomson, Leon van den Eijkel, Phil Price, Brit Bunkley, Neil Dawson, Fatu Feu'u, Gregor Kregar, Peter Nicholls, Terry Stringer, Paratene Matchitt, Peter Lange, Denis O’Connor, Virginia King, Graham Bennett, Gill Gatfield, Veronica Herber, Regan Gentry, Konstantin Dimopoulos, Suji Park, Seung Yul Oh, Ioane Ioane, David McCracken, Dion Hitchens, Tiffany Singh, Brett Graham, Sriwhana Spong, Chris Bailey and Dane Mitchell.

Events

Gallery

References 

Waiheke Island
Art exhibitions in New Zealand
2003 establishments in New Zealand